Cardinal Leger Secondary School is a separate school in the downtown sector of Brampton, Ontario, Canada. It is a member of the Dufferin-Peel Catholic District School Board and is connected to both St. Mary's Parish and St. Annes. The school enrolls about 1300 students.

History
Cardinal Leger opened in 1976, originally named St. Stephens. The school expanded in 1980 and underwent major renovations in 1995 in order to attain its current modern appearance. It was the first Catholic high school in Brampton.

Activities

The school offers a large variety of extracurricular programs, including the multi-cultural show, an extensive music program, dramatic arts program, as well as the traditional Christmas Basket drive, which is run and developed by students every year.

The school is also famous for the French Immersion program, as it is currently the only catholic high school to offer it in the City of Brampton. 

Cardinal Leger has a wide variety of sports teams, including cross country, tennis, volleyball, golf, basketball, girls' flag football, wrestling, swimming, curling, hockey, badminton, soccer, track and field, baseball, ultimate frisbee and lacrosse.

The school offers several hospitality and tourism courses, as a part of their Specialist High Skills Major program.

Notable students and alumni
 Marc Eversley, general manager of Chicago Bulls

See also
List of high schools in Ontario

References

Educational institutions established in 1976
Catholic secondary schools in Ontario
High schools in Brampton
1976 establishments in Ontario